Pterandra isthmica is a species of plant in the Malpighiaceae family. It is endemic to Panama.  It is threatened by habitat loss.

References

Malpighiaceae
Endemic flora of Panama
Endangered plants
Taxonomy articles created by Polbot